Gate or Gaté is a surname that may refer to
Aaron Gate (born 1990), Olympic cyclist from New Zealand
Denis Gaté (born 1958), French Olympic rower
Gabriel Gaté (born 1955), French chef living in Australia
Simon Gate (1883–1945), Swedish painter, graphic designer, glass artist, and book illustrator and portraitist